Highway 350 is a highway in the Canadian province of Saskatchewan. It runs from Highway 18 near Torquay to North Dakota Highway 42 at the U.S. border at the Port of Torquay.

Major intersections 
From south to north:

See also 
Roads in Saskatchewan
Transportation in Saskatchewan

References

External links 

350